Umit Yucel Eminoglu (born 14 September 1994) is a footballer who plays for  side Alcester Town, where he plays as a midfielder.

He began his career with English Premier League side Aston Villa, spending 11 years in their academy without making a first-team appearance before he was released in 2013.

He has played for clubs in both England and Turkey, he made his professional debut in 2013 with Gençlerbirliği and after a short spell in English non-league football, briefly played for Giresunspor of the TFF First League and later Sancaktepe Belediyespor of the TFF Second League. He later returned to England to rejoin former club Redditch United, and short spells with a number of sides in the Midland Football Combination in 2014 and 2015, including Banbury United.

Eminoglu opted to represent Turkey internationally and has been capped at youth level.

Club career
Eminoglu progressed through the academy at Aston Villa, scoring nine times in the Premier Academy League in the 2011–12 season. He left in 2013 and signed a three-year contract with Turkish Süper Lig side Gençlerbirliği. On 25 September 2013, Eminoglu made his full professional debut for the Ankara-based club in the second round of the 2013–14 Turkish Cup. He came off the bench to replace Doğa Kaya in the 82nd minute of Gençlerbirliği's 2–1 victory over third-tier club Sarıyer.

However, his stay in Turkey was to be short-lived and he returned to England to sign for Hednesford Town of the Conference North in December 2013. He made two substitute appearances for Hednesford before becoming dual-registered with Redditch United later that month, scoring two goals in his first game against Bideford on 17 December 2013. He moved from Hednesford to Halesowen Town in January 2014, making just one substitute appearance against Rainworth Miners Welfare that month before departing.

In July 2014, he returned to Turkey to go on trial with newly promoted TFF First League club Giresunspor. He was one of a group of Giresunspor players who passed medical examinations on 24 July 2014. On 31 July, he was named in Giresunspor's 26-man squad for the 2014–15 season.

However, he once again returned to England shortly after. He made just one Turkish Cup appearance for Giresunspor before it was announced that he was to rejoin former club Redditch United in October 2014, subject to international clearance. He later played for Studley at the end of 2014 before moving on to play for Banbury United and Littleton. He signed for Bartley Green Illey F.C. on 27 February, and then joined Boldmere St. Michaels. He signed for Bromsgrove Sporting in June 2015. Eminoglu had another brief spell in Turkey, playing for the 3.Lig side Sancaktepe Belediyespor in late 2015 before returning to Bromsgrove Sporting.

On 2 July 2021, Eminoglu signed for Midland League Division Two side Alcester Town.

International career
Eminoglu is eligible to represent both Turkey and England at international level. He has earned three caps for Turkey's under-18 side.

References

External links

1994 births
Living people
Sportspeople from Solihull
Turkish footballers
Turkey youth international footballers
English footballers
English people of Turkish descent
Aston Villa F.C. players
Gençlerbirliği S.K. footballers
Hednesford Town F.C. players
Redditch United F.C. players
Halesowen Town F.C. players
Giresunspor footballers
Barwell F.C. players
Studley F.C. players
Banbury United F.C. players
Littleton F.C. players
Boldmere St. Michaels F.C. players
Bromsgrove Sporting F.C. players
Feckenham F.C. players
Darlaston Town (1874) F.C. players
Alcester Town F.C. players
Association football midfielders
Association football forwards